Bumper Draw ( Hindi: बंपर ड्रा ) is a Bollywood Hindi comedy film starring Rajpal Yadav, Omkar Das Manikpuri (Natha), Zakir Hussain and Rushad Rana. Directed & produced by Irshad Khan Co. and produced by Dinesh Kumar, the film was released to cinemas on 16 October 2015.

Synopsis
Bumper Draw is a hilarious film about two characters – Sunderlal & Farooq who befriend each other in a strange situation. After which, they both encounter Pestonji, an old Parsi man who adds to their existing list of problems. However at the end, Pestonji is the one who turns out to be a reward for both of them.

Marketing and promotion 
Director-producer Irshad Khan threw a party to celebrate the completion of his upcoming Hindi comedy movie Bumper Draw. The entire team was present to be a part of this celebration. Leading actors Rajpal Yadav, Rajesh Desai, Narendra Bedi, Singer Mudasir Ali and Co-producer Reshma Khan were seen at this do. Irshad Khan's close friends actor Irrfan Khan and filmmaker Tigmanshu Dhulia joined the celebrations held at Levo Lounge, Andheri.

After this completion party, the team launched the first look of the film at Wilson College's annual fest Adorea 2015 on 23 August. Bumper Draw is scheduled to release on 16 October.

The trailer of the movie was launched amidst much fanfare at Carnival Cinemas in Andheri on 14 Sep. 2015.  The film's lead actors were Rajpal Yadav, Zakir Hussain, Rina Charinya, T.P. Aggarwal, Raj Patel, Reshma Khan and Dinesh Kumar among others.

Cast
 Rajpal Yadav As  Farooq
 Zakir Hussain as  Gali Babba
Subrat Dutta  as  Villium
 Rushad Rana as Nariman 
 Bomi Dotiwala as Pestonjee 
 Omkar Das Manikpuri as  Sunderlal
 Meera as Item Song Girl
 Seema Azami as  Komal Bai 
 Abhishek Ingale as Rafiq 
 Deepa Sethi as Priya 
 Reena Charnya as Sharmila 
 Narendra Bedi as Dr. Y I M Bedi 
 Harish Kumaar as Haricharan
 
 Sitaram Panchal as Vaman Bhalerao 
 Hrishikesh Joshi as Inspector Parab

Soundtrack 
The soundtrack for the movie was composed by Rahul Mishra and the lyrics were penned by Irshad Khan.

References

External links
 
 
 

2015 films
2010s Hindi-language films
Indian comedy films
2015 comedy films
Hindi-language comedy films